Sayyid Sir Wasif Ali Mirza Khan Bahadur  (7 January 1875 – 23 October 1959) was the Nawab of Murshidabad during 1906–1959. Sir Wasif Ali Mirza was educated at Sherborne School, Rugby School and later at Trinity College. He succeeded his father Hassan Ali Mirza Khan Bahadur at his death on 25 December 1906. On 11 December 1931, Wasif Ali was forced to surrender the administration of his estates to the Government of India after incurring a debt of 19 lakhs. On 15 August 1947, the Radcliffe Award allotted the district of Murshidabad to Pakistan and the flag of Pakistan was hoisted at the Hazarduari Palace but within two days the two dominions exchanged Khulna, which is now in Bangladesh, and then the flag of India was hoisted at the grand palace on 17 August 1947. The Government of India also resumed him all his estates in 1953. Wasif Ali was also the founder and president of the Hindu–Muslim Unity Association in the year 1937, named Anjuman-e-Musalman-e-Bangla, which promoted Hindu–Muslim unity. The Nawab also built the Wasif Manzil.

Sir Wasif Ali died at the age of 84 at his Calcutta residence at 85 Park Street in Calcutta on 23 October 1959. He was succeeded by his eldest son, Waris Ali Mirza Khan Bahadur.

Life

Early years

Sir Wasif Ali Mirza was the eldest son of Hassan Ali Mirza by his first wife, Amir Dulhan Kulsum-un-nisa Begum. He was born on at Hazarduari Palace on 7 January 1875. At the age of 12, Sir Wasif Ali Mirza was sent to England for his education. He was accompanied by his younger brother, Nasir Ali Mirza Bahadur and were under the charge of Mr. Coles, the Principal of Dovetan College in Calcutta (the school is now known as Park Mansion) as the Atalıq. Sir Wasif Ali Mirza was educated at Sherborne School, Rugby School and later at Trinity College, Oxford. After completing his courses the young prince, visited places of importance in England and travelled extensively in Scotland, Ireland, Egypt, Austria, Turkey, Italy, France and Germany. He returned to Murshidabad on 27 October 1895 with his brother.

Later years

Sir Wasif Ali administrated the Nizamat on the behalf of his father, Hassan Ali Mirza from the years 1895 to 1899. He chaired the municipality of Murshidabad from 1899 to 1901 and also represented Bengal at the coronations of King-Emperor Edward VII and Queen-Empress Alexandra at Westminster Abbey in London in 1902, and also of King-Emperor George V and Queen Empress Mary at the same place in 1911. Sir Wasif Ali succeeded his father, Hassan Ali Mirza after his death on 25 December 1906 as the Nawab of Murshidabad under the oriental titles of Ihtisham ul-Mulk (Dignifier of the country), Raes ud-Daulah (Premier of the state), Amir ul-Omrah (Noble of Nobles) and Mahabat Jang (Horror in War). Sir Wasif Ali had also been a member of the Bengal Legislative Council for eight times and used to take great interest in Municipal matters and was the patron of the Calcutta Historical Society. The Nawab is reputed for efficiently managing his estates and also public charities. The Nawab is also well known for his English and Urdu poems. He is also the author of the book "A Mind's Reproduction" (1934).

On 11 December 1931, Wasif Ali was forced to surrender the administration of his estates to the Government of India after incurring a debt of 19 lakhs. On 15 August 1947, the Radcliffe Award allotted the district of Murshidabad to Pakistan and the flag of Pakistan was hoisted at the Hazarduari Palace but within two days the two dominions exchanged Khulna, which is now in Bangladesh, and then the flag of India was hoisted at the grand palace on 17 August 1947. The Government of India also resumed him all his estates in 1953. Wasif Ali was also the founder and president of the Hindu-Muslim Unity Association in the year 1937, named Anjuman-e-Musalman-e-Bangla. The Nawab also built the Wasif Manzil, and named it after him.

Death and succession

Sir Wasif Ali died at the age of 84 at his Calcutta residence at 85 Park Street in Calcutta on 23 October 1959. He was survived by six sons and six daughters and was succeeded by his eldest son, Waris Ali Mirza Khan Bahadur.

Personality 

Sir Wasif Ali Mirza possessed charming and refined manners. His noble appearance, which beamed with intelligence, was the reason for why he attracted the attraction of everyone who came in contact with him. It had truly been said of him that he had all the attributes of an eastern prince with the bearing of a western gentleman. his command of English language and literature, together with his knowledge of English manners, customs and etiquette, which he acquired during his lengthy stay in England, was the most admirable things in him. The Nawab used to take a keen interest in outdoor but healthy pastimes such as cricket, football and tennis. His love of sport lured him on to tiger hunting and also, boar hunting. In polo, at which he was a crack player, he usually used to captain a team whose colours were very rarely lowered.

Honours

King Edward VII Coronation Medal -1902
 Delhi Durbar Gold Medal -1903
 Knight Commander of the Order of the Star of India (KCSI) -1910
 Delhi Durbar Gold Medal -1911
 King George V Coronation Medal -1911
 Knight Commander of the Royal Victorian Order (KCVO) -1912
 King George V Silver Jubilee Medal -1935
 King George VI Coronation Medal -1937

Wasif Manzil

Wasif Manzil (also known as Wasef Manzil and New Palace) was built by Sir Wasif Ali Mirza under the direction and supervision of Mr. Vivian, officer of the Public Works Department of the Nadia Rivers Division and Surendra Barat, a Bengali engineer. This building, rather palace was used by the Nawab as his residence. The building is extremely close to the Hazarduari Palace. It is built on the Nizamat Fort Campus between the campus's Dakshin Darwaza (south gate) and the Hazarduari Palace, just opposite the campus's South Zurud Mosque and parallel to the Bhagirathi River.

Family

Wives

The following is a list of the principal wives of Sir Wasif Ali Mirza. He married:

 H.H. Nawab Sultan Dulhan Faghfur Jahan Begum Sahiba (née Sahibzadi Nadar Jahan Begum) at Calcutta in 1898. She was the daughter of Wasif Ali's paternal uncle, Wala Kadir (Husain Ali Mirza Bahadur).
 Nawab Mumtaz Mahal Imami Begum Sahiba in 1903 (divorced). She was the widow of Ahmad Kadir, (Sahibzada Sayyid Banda Abbas Mirza Bahadur) and the daughter of Kaiwan Kadir (Sahibzada Sayyid Ahmad Ali Mirza Bahadur).
 Nawab Mehar Jahan Dildar Ara Begum Sahiba. She was the daughter of Ahmad Kadir (Sahibzada Sayyid Banda Abbas Mirza Bahadur).

Sir Wasif Ali also had two mut‘ah wives as follows:

 Sugra Khanum
 Sushila Khanum

Descendants

The following is a list of the children, grandchildren, great grandchildren and great great grandchildren of Sir Wasif Ali Mirza:

 Sayyid Waris Ali Mirza Bahadur (s/o Faghfur Jahan Begum), who succeeded Sir Wasif Ali Mirza as the next Nawab of Murshidabad.
 Sayyid Fatehyab Ali Mirza Bahadur (s/o Faghfur Jahan Begum)
 Sayyid Kazem Ali Mirza Bahadur (s/o Faghfur Jahan Begum). He was born at Murshidabad on 31 October 1911 and was the son of Nadir Jahan Begum. He was educated at the Nawab Bahadur Institution in Murshidabad and St. Xavier's College in Calcutta. He was also the manager of the Murshidabad Wakf Estates (from 1939 till 1947) and chaired the Murshidabad Municipality and President of the Murshidabad District Sch Bord in 1956. He was also the MLA for Murshidabad South-West Bengal (1937–1947) and also for West Bengal (1947–1952), for Lalgola (1952–1967) and Murshidabad (1967–1977). Kazem was the Deputy Minister for Cottage & Small Scale Industries, and for Public Works (1962–1967), MP of the sixth Lok Sabha for Murshidabad (1977–1980). He married Husun Agaz Ara Begum, the elder daughter of his paternal uncle, Iskander Kadir Sahibzada Sayyid Nasir Ali Mirza Bahadur (the younger brother of Wasif Ali), by his wife, Muhammadi Begum and Hashmat Feroz Najam Ara Begum, who was also the younger daughter of Iskander Kadir Sahibzada Sayyid Nasir Ali Mirza Bahadur, by his wife, Muhammadi Begum. Kazem Ali Mirza died at Calcutta on 14 July 1988 and was survived by 3 sons and 7 daughters as follows:
 Sayyid Shahinshah Ali Mirza (s/o Feroz Nazam Ara Begum). 
 Sayyid Shariyar Ali Mirza (s/o Feroz Nazam Ara Begum).
 Sayyid Wasif Ali Mirza.
 Kishwar Jahan Begum (d/o Husun Agaz Ara Begum).
Anwar Jahan Begum (Mussarat Jahan Masuma Begum) (d/o Husun Agaz Ara Begum).
 Raffat Jahan Begum (d/o Husun Agaz Ara Begum). 
 Nadir Jahan Begum.
 Sarfaraz Jahan Begum.
 Nighat Jahan Begum.
 Naheed Jahan Begum.
(One of these above-mentioned daughters married a man named, Sayyid Muhammad Hashim Mirza, the son of Kaikaus Kadir Sahibzada Sayyid Farhad Mirza Bahadur.
 Sayyid Imran Ali Mirza Bahadur (s/o Faghfur Jahan Begum)
 Sayyid Said Ali Mirza Bahadur. He died at a very young age.
 Sayyid Sajjad Ali Mirza Bahadur (s/o Sugra Khanum). He was born in 1950 and assumed the claims of his elder half brother after the latter's death in November 1998 and pursued it in court, but failed to establish one before he died. He married Afshan Begum and died before 2006 and was survived by two daughters.
 Husna Ara Begum (Mummio Begum Sahiba). She was born in 1900. She married Nawab Ali Haider Khan, elder son of Nawab Ali Amjad Khan of the Prithimpassa Nawab Family and leader of the Independent Muslim Party (1937–38), Minister of Agriculture (1939–41) and Minister of Power and Water Development (1942–46) in Assam. Husna Ara Begum died in 1982. They had three children as follows:
 Ali Safdar Khan 
 Syed un-Nisa Begum 
 Ali Sarwar Khan
 Safia Banu Ara Begum. She married Baqir Ali Khan.
 Qamarat Ara Begum.
 Hashmat un-Nisa Begum. She married Sayyid Muhammad Sadiq Ali Mirza (d. 1959), son of Sayyid Zaigham Mirza, by his wife, Khurshid un-nisa Begum Sahiba, (daughter of Nawab Hassan Ali Mirza Khan Bahadur of Murshidabad). She Hashmat un-Nisa died at Calcutta in 1995, having had issue Sayyid Md Abbas Ali Mirza Bahadur (who was recognised as the lawful Nawab of Murshidabad by the Indian Supreme Court in August 2014) and Sayyid Raza Ali Meerza.
 Jamal Ara Begum (full sister of Husna Ara). She married Nawab Ali Asghar Khan (d. at Decca or Dhaka on 6 April 1984), younger son of Nawab Amjad Ali Khan of the Prithimpassa Nawab Family and MLA India 1946. Jamal Ara Begum died at Decca on 22 March 1984 and was survived by a son.
 A daughter. (d/o Dildar Begum). She married Muhammad Ali Khan.

Photos

See also

 List of rulers of Bengal
 Nawabs of Bengal and Murshidabad
 History of Bengal
 History of Bangladesh
 History of India
 Wasif Manzil

References

External links
 Site dedicated to Sir Wasif Ali Mirza

1875 births
1959 deaths
Nawabs of Murshidabad
Knights Commander of the Order of the Star of India
Knights Commander of the Royal Victorian Order
Indian Knights Commander of the Royal Victorian Order